Simon Backman (born June 12, 1984) is a Finnish former ice hockey defenceman.

Backman played in Liiga for TPS and SaiPa. He also played in the Metal Ligaen in Denmark for EfB Ishockey and in the HockeyAllsvenskan in Sweden for IF Björklöven.

Career statistics

References

External links

1984 births
IF Björklöven players
EfB Ishockey players
Finnish ice hockey defencemen
Living people
SaiPa players
HC TPS players
People from Jakobstad
Sportspeople from Ostrobothnia (region)
21st-century Finnish people